Assumption Island Airport  is an airport serving Assumption Island in the Seychelles.

See also

Transport in Seychelles
List of airports in Seychelles

References

External links
OpenStreetMap - Assumption
OurAirports - Assumption
SkyVector - Assumption
FallingRain - Assumption Airport

Airports in Seychelles